Ichthyodectiformes is an extinct order of marine stem-teleost ray-finned fish. The order is named after the genus Ichthyodectes, established by Edward Drinker Cope in 1870. Ichthyodectiforms are usually considered to be some of the closest relatives of the teleost crown group.

They were most diverse throughout the Cretaceous period, though basal forms like Thrissops, Occithrissops and Allothrissops are known from the Middle-Late Jurassic of Europe and North America. Most ichthyodectiforms ranged between 1 and 5 meters (3–15 ft) in length. Most of known taxa were predators, feeding on smaller fish; in several cases, larger ichthyodectiforms preyed on smaller members of the order. Some species had remarkably large teeth, though others, such as Gillicus arcuatus, had small ones and sucked in their prey. Heckelichthys preopercularis is a rare example of non-predatory ichthyodectiform, more likely to be microphagous, fed on small particles. There is evidence that at least one species, Xiphactinus audax, may have been endothermic ("warm-blooded").

Systematics
The basal phylogeny is badly resolved, leading to many ichthyodectiforms that are simply known to be rather primitive, but where nothing certain can be said about their precise relationships.

Ichthyodectiformes
 Africathrissops Taverne, 2010
 Allothrissops Nybelin, 1964
 Altamuraichthys Taverne, 2016
 Antarctithrissops Arratia et al., 2004
 Ascalabothrissops? Arratia, 2000
 Capassoichthys Taverne, 2015
 Dugaldia Lees, 1990
 Faugichthys Taverne & Chanet, 2000
 Furloichthys Taverne & Capasso, 2018
 Garganoichthys Taverne, 2009
 Occithrissops Schaeffer & Patterson, 1984
 Ogunichthys Alvarado-Ortega & Brito, 2009
 Pachythrissops? Woodward, 1919
 Prymnetes Cope, 1871
 Thrissops Agassiz, 1843
 Sultanuvaisia Nesov, 1981
 Unamichthys Alvarado-Ortega, 2004
 Verraesichthys Taverne, 2010
 Chuhsiungichthyidae Yabumoto, 1994
 Chuhsiungichthys Lew, 1974
 Jinjuichthys Kim et al., 2014
 Mesoclupea Ping & Yen, 1933
 Bardackichthyidae Hacker & Shimada, 2021
 Amakusaichthys  Yabumoto et al., 2020
 Bardackichthys Hacker & Shimada, 2021
 Heckelichthys Taverne, 2008
 Cladocyclidae Maisey, 1991
 Aidachar Nesov, 1981
 Chirocentrites Heckel, 1849
 Chiromystus Cope, 1885
 Cladocyclus Agassiz, 1841
 Cladocynodon de Mayrinck et al., 2023
 Eubiodectes Hay, 1903
 Ichthyodectidae Crook, 1892
 Cooyoo Bartholomai & Less, 1987
 Ghrisichthys Cavin et al., 2013
 Ichthyodectes Cope, 1870
 Postredectes Kaddumi, 2009
 Xiphactinus Leidy, 1870
 Saurodontidae Cope, 1870
 Gillicus Cope, 1875
 Gwawinapterus Arbour & Currie, 2011
 Prosaurodon Stewart, 1999
 Saurocephalus Harlan, 1824
 Saurodon Hay, 1830
 Vallecillichthys Blanco & Cavin, 2003

References

 
Prehistoric ray-finned fish orders
Late Jurassic first appearances
Late Cretaceous extinctions